Wé is a small town in the commune of Lifou, in the Loyalty Islands Province, New Caledonia. It is located on the east coast of Lifou Island. Wé is the administrative centre of the commune of Lifou as well as the location of the provincial assembly of the Loyalty Islands.

Populated places in New Caledonia
Loyalty Islands